Charles Albert Small (October 24, 1905 – January 14, 1953) was an American center fielder in Major League Baseball player who played in 25 games for the Boston Red Sox during the 1930 baseball season. Born in Auburn, Maine, he was used almost exclusively as a pinch hitter, playing only one game in the field. He died in Auburn at age 47. Small was a 1927 graduate of Bates College in Maine.

External links

Major League Baseball center fielders
Boston Red Sox players
Baseball players from Maine
Bates Bobcats baseball players
Sportspeople from Auburn, Maine
Minor league baseball managers
1905 births
1953 deaths
Pittsfield Hillies players
Albany Senators players
Des Moines Demons players
Wilkes-Barre Barons players
Hazleton Mountaineers players
Sydney Steel Citians players
Drummondville Tigers players
Trois-Rivières Renards players
Quebec Athletics players
Granby Red Sox players